Rubinald Rofino Pronk (born 17 July ), born and raised in The Hague, Netherlands, is a danseur performing with the Morphoses/The Wheeldon Company. He trained at the Royal (Dutch) Conservatory of Dance and joined the Dutch National Ballet at age 16 and was promoted to soloist. Rubinald performed works by choreographers including Sir Frederick Ashton, George Balanchine, William Forsythe, Jacopo Godani, Martha Graham and Krzysztof Pastor. In 2006 he joined Dwight Rhoden and Desmond Richardson's Complexions Contemporary Ballet, performing works by Rhoden and Ulysses Dove. He is a guest artist with Dutch National Ballet and in 2009–2011 with Polish National Ballet.

External links 
 
 Facebook page

1979 births
Living people
Dutch male ballet dancers
Morphoses dancers
Entertainers from The Hague